Joe Kent is an American political candidate and retired officer of the United States Army Special Forces. He was the Republican nominee in the 2022 election for Washington's 3rd congressional district, having defeated incumbent Jaime Herrera Beutler in the primary; he ultimately lost to Democrat Marie Gluesenkamp Perez in an upset.

He is the widower of Shannon M. Kent.

Early life and military service 

Kent was born in Sweet Home, Oregon and raised in Portland. He was a member of the Boy Scouts of America.

Kent enlisted in the army at 18 as an infantryman. He served as an officer of the United States Army Special Forces, having applied shortly before the September 11 attacks, and served 11 combat deployments. While in the Army, he also worked as a paramilitary officer for the CIA.

Kent stepped down from service when his wife, Shannon, was killed in the 2019 Manbij bombing. Afterwards, he served on the advisory board for Military Veterans for Trump, and wrote an op-ed for NBCNews.com praising his personal encounter with President Donald Trump. He also moved to Yacolt, Washington after moving back to Portland for a period following his retirement, claiming that "the far left had ruined that city".

Political candidacy 
Kent announced the launching of his campaign for Washington's 3rd congressional district on February 18, 2021; he stated incumbent Representative Jaime Herrera Beutler's vote in favor of the second impeachment of Donald Trump as a factor in his decision to run. His candidacy was endorsed by Trump and numerous other prominent figures from the party's pro-Trump wing, such as Michael Flynn and Matt Gaetz. During his campaign, he was a frequent guest on Tucker Carlson Tonight, Steve Bannon's show Bannon's War Room, and various programs on One America News Network and InfoWars.

On August 3, 2022, Kent finished second in the nonpartisan primary for the congressional race, advancing to the general election against Democratic candidate Marie Gluesenkamp Perez. Herrera Beutler finished third in the primary; she did not endorse Kent.

In what was widely considered a major upset, with FiveThirtyEight having given Kent 98 in 100 odds of winning, Kent lost the election to Perez. He subsequently claimed he would not concede until "every legal vote is counted". Kent ultimately conceded on December 21, following a recount.

On January 11, 2023, Kent announced he would be running again for the same House seat in 2024, claiming that Perez "votes in lockstep w/ the radical left's agenda that's crushing working families" in his announcement tweet.

Political views 
Kent has been characterized as a far-right politician. Kent has labeled his political philosophy as "inclusive populism", with a spokesman stating that it "rejects racism and bigotry" while promoting an "America First agenda".

Kent has made false claims that the 2020 presidential election was stolen from Donald Trump a focus of his campaign. He has labeled the perpetrators of the 2021 Capitol insurrection as "political prisoners" and spoke at a rally in defense of them organized by his top adviser. He supports impeaching Joe Biden and - in the wake of the FBI search of Mar-a-Lago - Merrick Garland.

Kent has also stated that he thinks Anthony Fauci should be charged with murder for the "scam that is COVID". In a September 2022 debate against Perez, Kent claimed that he was unvaccinated and that the COVID-19 vaccines are "experimental gene therapy".

Kent considers himself a non-interventionist, citing his experience and the death of his wife. He claimed in the aforementioned debate that he lost many friends and his wife due to "our ruling class - Republicans and Democrats - consistently [having] lied to the American people to keep us engaged in wars abroad".

Affiliations with far-right groups 
Kent's 2021 campaign was endorsed early on by prominent white nationalist commentator Nick Fuentes. Fuentes had partaken in a call with Kent around then discussing social media strategy; Kent has claimed that he has not had any contact with Fuentes since then and rejected Fuentes' endorsement.

At the urging of a Republican competitor, Kent made an explicit disavowal of Fuentes' support of his campaign in the wake of his praising of Vladimir Putin over the 2022 Russian invasion of Ukraine. Shortly afterwards, Kent appeared on a webcast by far right group American Populist Union to explain his disavowal of Fuentes. On it, he stated that his disavowal was "more of a tactics thing" and that he "[didn't] think there’s anything wrong with there being a white people special interest group".

Graham Jorgensen, a member of the neo-fascist organization Proud Boys, was employed as a consultant for Kent's campaign. Joey Gibson, founder of far-right group Patriot Prayer, has also been linked to Kent; Gibson heavily promoted Kent's campaign on social media and spoke at a fundraiser for Kent, in which Kent praised Gibson for "defend[ing] this community when our community was under assault from antifa".

In September 2022, Andrew Kaczynski of CNN unearthed an interview from June 2022 between Kent and Greyson Arnold, a neo-Nazi YouTube streamer. A spokesman for Kent's campaign claimed that Kent was unaware of who Arnold was and assumed he was a local journalist. However, in April 2022, Kent was photographed with Arnold at a fundraiser.

References

External links

1980 births
Oregon Republicans
Washington (state) Republicans
People from Sweet Home, Oregon
Politicians from Portland, Oregon
People from Clark County, Washington
Members of the United States Army Special Forces
People of the Central Intelligence Agency
United States Army personnel of the War in Afghanistan (2001–2021)
Norwich University alumni
Candidates in the 2022 United States House of Representatives elections
American conspiracy theorists
Far-right politicians in the United States
Living people
Right-wing populism in the United States
Candidates in the 2024 United States House of Representatives elections